Secret Voyage is the seventh studio album by the group Blackmore's Night. According to a SPV press release, Secret Voyage is another kaleidoscopic musical journey through time and space, incorporating and rearranging traditional melodies from all over Europe, blending the "old" and contemporary. Secret Voyage consists of twelve new tracks, recorded by Candice Night, Ritchie Blackmore and their Band of Minstrels.

Secret Voyage won the New Age Reporter Lifestyle Music Award as the best Celtic album. It was also nominated for NAR awards in two more categories - Best Vocal Album and Best Cover Artwork for a CD.

Track listing

Release history

Charts

References

2008 albums
Blackmore's Night albums
SPV/Steamhammer albums